Frederik Lund Gytkjær (born 16 March 1993) is a Danish professional footballer who plays for Danish Superliga club Lyngby Boldklub.

A versatile player, Gytkjær has both played as a forward and as a midfielder throughout his career. Besides playing for Lyngby, he has also played two seasons for Norwegian club Haugesund. Between 2008 and 2012, Gytkjær represented Denmark at four levels.

Club career

Lyngby

1998–12: Youth career
Gytkjær played for local clubs Jyllinge FC and Ølstykke FC before joining the academy of Lyngby Boldklub in 2004. There, he was described as "one of the best Danish players born in 1993", according to Niels Frederiksen who was then in charge of Lyngby's academy. In 2009, at the age of sixteen, he joined the Hamburger SV academy for a trial, before returning the Lyngby where he signed a contract extension the following year.

2012–16: First team
Gytkjær was promoted to the Lyngby first team in the summer of 2012 alongside fellow academy players, among other Uffe Bech who would go on to play for Hannover 96 and Panathinaikos later in his career. Gytkjær made his first team-debut on 18 November 2012, coming on as a substitute for Fanol Përdedaj in the 89th minute of a 1–1 draw home against AB. He ended the season with no goals in 9 appearances.

The following season, Gytkjær started playing more regularly during Lyngby's 2013–14 campaign in the Danish second tier, which ended in third place. At the end of the season, he signed a one-year contract extension with the club, after finishing the season with three goals in 28 total appearances.

Gytkjær started to score more goals during the next two seasons in the Danish second tier, with a notable climax on 24 September 2014, where he scored six goals in a Danish Cup matchup against Kalundborg GB which ended in a 10–0 win for Lyngby. During these two seasons, ending in promotion to the Danish Superliga, Gytkjær scored 20 goals in 45 league appearances, marking a more offensive role for the midfielder.

Haugesund
After half a season in the Superliga, Gytkjær signed a three-and-a-half year contract with Norwegian club Haugesund on 7 December 2016. He made his debut against Strømsgodset on 2 April 2017, the first match of the 2017 Eliteserien season, scoring his first goal after just 19 seconds in a 3–1 loss for Haugesund. The following week he scored a brace in a 4–3 win over Vålerenga. On 6 July, Gytkjær made his European debut starting in a 0–0 away draw against Northern Irish club Coleraine in the first qualifying round of the 2017–18 Europa League. After advancing 7–0 on aggregate, Haugesund drew Polish club Lech Poznań in the second round, meaning a matchup between Gytkjær and his brother, Christian. Gytkjær and Haugesund would go on to lose 4–3 on aggregate, after beating Lech Poznań 3–2 at home in the first matchup. He finished the season with 29 total appearances, in which he scored six goals.

The following season, Gytkjær saw less playing time and on 30 November 2018, he was released by Haugesund a year before the expiration of his contract making him a free agent. He made a total of 49 appearances for the club in which he scored 14 goals.

Return to Lyngby
On 15 January 2019, Gytkjær agreed a transfer to his former club Lyngby. He signed a one-and-a-half year deal with De Kongeblå. His return was praised by director of football, Birger Jørgensen, who called him a "local hero". Gytkjær made his first appearance since his return to the club on 3 March in a 1–0 win over Hvidovre IF, and scored his first goal from a free-kick on 21 April in a 3–0 win over Nykøbing FC in the Danish second tier. His first season after returning to Lyngby resulted in promotion to the Danish Superliga.

He suffered relegation to the Danish 1st Division again with the club on 9 May 2021 after a loss to last placed AC Horsens.

On 1 September 2021, Gytkjær scored four goals in a 5–1 win over Tårnby FF in the second round of the Danish Cup. He suffered a concussion in a league match against FC Fredericia on 28 February 2022, sidelining him for the rest of the season which saw Lyngby win promotion back to the Superliga.

International career
Gytkjær has appeared internationally for Denmark at under-16, 17, 18 and 20-levels, making 28 total appearances in which he scored seven goals.

Personal life
He is the younger brother of Monza striker Christian Gytkjær.

Career statistics

Club

References

External links

 Frederik Gytkjær at dbu.dk

Danish men's footballers
Denmark youth international footballers
Danish Superliga players
Danish 1st Division players
1993 births
Living people
People from Roskilde
Lyngby Boldklub players
Danish expatriate men's footballers
Expatriate footballers in Norway
Danish expatriate sportspeople in Norway
FK Haugesund players
Eliteserien players
Association football midfielders
Sportspeople from Region Zealand